Equestrian at the 2008 Summer Paralympics consisted of eleven dressage events. The competitions were held in the Hong Kong Olympic Equestrian Centre from 7 September to 11 September.

Classification
Riders were given a classification depending on the type and extent of their disability. The classification system allows riders to compete against others with a similar level of function.

Equestrian classes were:
I, for riders with impaired limb function, or poor balance and good upper limb function
II, for riders with locomotion impairment 
III, for blind riders with moderate locomotion impairment
IV, for riders with some visual impairment or impaired function in one or two limbs

Events
For each of the events below, medals were contested for one or more of the above classifications. After each classification are given the dates that the event was contested. All events were mixed, meaning that men and women competed together.

Mixed individual championship
 Grade Ia
 Grade Ib
 Grade II
 Grade III
 Grade IV
Mixed individual freestyle
 Grade Ia
 Grade Ib
 Grade II
 Grade III
 Grade IV
Mixed team

Officials
Appointment of officials is as follows:

Dressage
  Hanneke Gerritsen (Ground Jury President)
  Liliana Iannone (Ground Jury Member)
  Anne Prain (Ground Jury Member)
  Tarja Huttunen (Ground Jury Member)
  Janet Geary (Ground Jury Member)
  Gudrun Hofinga (Ground Jury Member)
  Kjell Myhre (Ground Jury Member)
  Alison Mastin (Ground Jury Member)

Qualification
There were 73 athletes from 28 nations taking part in this sport.

Medal summary

Medal table

This ranking sorts countries by the number of gold medals earned by their riders (in this context a country is an entity represented by a National Paralympic Committee). The number of silver medals is taken into consideration next and then the number of bronze medals. If, after the above, countries are still tied, equal ranking is given and they are listed alphabetically.

Medalists 
Laurentia Tan of Singapore won her country's first Paralympic medals, two bronzes, in the individual championship and freestyle grade Ia events.

See also
 Equestrian at the 2008 Summer Olympics

References

External links
Official site of the 2008 Summer Paralympics

FEI:Fédération Equestre Internationale

 
2008
2008 Summer Paralympics events
International sports competitions hosted by Hong Kong
2008 in Hong Kong sport
2008 in equestrian
Equestrian sports competitions in Hong Kong
Para Dressage